Future Pilot A.K.A. is the pseudonym of Glasgow indie musician Sushil K. Dade. Dade is a former member of the Soup Dragons, BMX Bandits and Telstar Ponies. Future Pilot's music blends classic indie pop with Indian classical, dub and hip hop influences.

Discography
Dade has released four albums under the Future Pilot name on a variety of record labels, including Stephen Pastel's Geographic and most recently, Creeping Bent. The Future Pilot project is particularly noted for its vast range of collaborators and guest contributions from figures as diverse as composer Philip Glass, writer Alasdair Gray, Thurston Moore, Kim Gordon of Sonic Youth, Karine Polwart, Can's Damo Suzuki and members of the Glasgow indie scene, including Stuart Murdoch and Teenage Fanclub.

Albums
 Vs A Galaxy of Sound (1999) (Sulphur)
 Tiny Waves, Mighty Sea (2001) (Geographic)
 Salute Your Soul (2004) (Geographic)
 Secrets From the Clockhouse (2007) (Creeping Bent)
 Orkestra Digitalis 2019

Personal life
Having previously worked as a driving instructor, Dade is currently a producer for BBC Radio 3 after completing BBC Scotland's E Force programme, set up to encourage more diversity in the BBC. He is married and has two children, and lives in the Glasgow suburb of Bearsden with his young family.

Other projects
Between 2006 and 2012 Dade was a member of genre-crossing collective The Burns Unit along with others including Emma Pollock, Chris Difford, King Creosote and Karine Polwart.  The supergroup released their debut album in 2009.

References

Scottish indie rock groups
Scottish pop music groups